Virasat  is a 1999 Pakistani Urdu movie starring Saima and Shaan. Film song lyrics by Altaf Bajwa and Saeed Gillani. Singers were Shazia Manzoor, Saira Nasim and Azra Jehan, film music composer is Ustad Tafu.

References

1999 films
1990s Urdu-language films
Pakistani drama films